FERM domain containing 4B is a protein that in humans is encoded by the FRMD4B gene.

Function

This gene encodes a GRP1-binding protein which contains a FERM protein interaction domain as well as two coiled coil domains. This protein may play a role as a scaffolding protein.

References

Further reading